Monarda punctata is a herbaceous plant in the mint family, Lamiaceae, that is native to eastern Canada, the eastern United States and northeastern Mexico. Common names include spotted beebalm and horsemint.

It is a thyme-scented plant with heads of purple-spotted tubular yellow flowers above rosettes of large white- or pink-tipped bracts. The plant contains thymol, an antiseptic and fungicide. It was historically used to treat upset stomachs, colds, diarrhea, neuralgia and kidney disease.

Varieties
Monarda punctata var. arkansana (E.M.McClint. & Epling) Shinners
Monarda punctata var. correllii B.L.Turner
Monarda punctata var. coryi (E.M.McClint. & Epling) Shinners
Monarda punctata var. immaculata (Pennell) Scora
Monarda punctata var. intermedia (E.M.McClint. & Epling) Waterf.
Monarda punctata var. lasiodonta A.Gray
Monarda punctata var. occidentalis (Epling) E.J.Palmer & Steyerm.
Monarda punctata var. punctata
Monarda punctata var. villicaulis (Pennell) E.J.Palmer & Steyerm.

Description
Unlike the most familiar Monarda species that have a single flower head on a stem, Monarda punctata has flowers that are stacked up the stem with bracts radiating from the stem, under each flower. Varying in color from light pink to white, the bracts are ornamental longer than the flowers, whereas the flowers (yellow with brown spots) are visible only at close range.

Ecological value
Monarda punctata attracts pollinators in great numbers, especially wasps. Among the wasps that it brings to the garden are beneficial predatory wasps that control grubs, pest caterpillars, and other harmful insects.

References

External links

http://mtcubacenter.org/trials/monarda/monarda-punctata/

punctata
Plants described in 1753
Flora of the Eastern United States
Flora of the United States
Flora of Northeastern Mexico
Flora of Canada
Taxa named by Carl Linnaeus